Kokugaku (literally "national study") was an academic movement, a school of Japanese philology and philosophy originating during the Tokugawa period. Kokugaku scholars worked to refocus Japanese scholarship away from the then-dominant study of Chinese, Confucian, and Buddhist texts in favor of research into the early Japanese classics.

History

What later became known as the kokugaku tradition began in the 17th and 18th centuries as  kogaku ("ancient studies"), wagaku ("Japanese studies") or inishie manabi ("ancient studies"), a term favored by Motoori Norinaga and his school. Drawing heavily from Shinto and Japan's ancient literature, the school looked back to a golden age of culture and society. They drew upon ancient Japanese poetry, predating the rise of medieval Japan's feudal orders in the mid-twelfth century, and other cultural achievements to show the emotion of Japan. One famous emotion appealed to by the kokugakusha is 'mono no aware'.

The word kokugaku, coined to distinguish this school from kangaku ("Chinese studies"), was popularized by Hirata Atsutane in the 19th century. It has been translated as 'Native Studies' and represented a response to Sinocentric Neo-Confucian theories. Kokugaku scholars criticized the repressive moralizing of Confucian thinkers, and tried to re-establish Japanese culture before the influx of foreign modes of thought and behaviour.

Eventually, the thinking of kokugaku scholars influenced the sonnō jōi philosophy and movement. It was this philosophy, amongst other things, that led to the eventual collapse of the Tokugawa shogunate in 1868 and the subsequent Meiji Restoration.

Tenets
The kokugaku school held that the Japanese national character was naturally pure, and would reveal its inherent splendor once the foreign (Chinese)  influences were removed.  The "Chinese heart" was considered different from the "true heart" or "Japanese Heart".  This true Japanese spirit needed to be revealed by removing a thousand years of Chinese learning. It thus took an interest in philologically identifying the ancient, indigenous meanings of ancient Japanese texts; in turn, these ideas were synthesized with early Shinto and European astronomy.

Influence
The term kokugaku was used liberally by early modern Japanese to refer to the "national learning" of each of the world's nations. This usage was adopted into Chinese, where it is still in use today (C: guoxue). The Chinese also adopted the kokugaku term "national essence" (J: kokusui, C: 国粹 guocui).

According to scholar of religion Jason Ānanda Josephson, kokugaku played a role in the consolidation of State Shinto in the Meiji era. It promoted a unified, scientifically grounded and politically powerful vision of Shinto against Buddhism, Christianity, and Japanese folk religions, many of which were named "superstitions."

Notable kokugaku scholars
 Hanawa Hokiichi
 Hagiwara Hiromichi
 
 Hirata Atsutane
 Hayashi Ōen
 Kada no Azumamaro 
 Kamo no Mabuchi
 
 Motoori Norinaga
 Motoori Ōhira
 Motoori Haruniwa
 
 
 Shimazaki Masaki
 Tsunoda Tadayuki
 Nakane Kōtei
 Yamakuni Hyōbu
 Ueda Akinari
 Date Munehiro
 
 
 Kume Kunitake
 Hasuda Zenmei

See also
 Japanese nationalism 
 Keichū
 Koshinto
 Mitogaku
 Nihonjinron
 Rangaku

References

Further reading
 Harry Harootunian, Things Seen and Unseen: Discourse and Ideology in Tokugawa Nativism. Chicago: University of Chicago Press, 1988.
 Mark McNally, Proving the Way: Conflict and Practice in the History of Japanese Nativism. Cambridge, Massachusetts: Harvard UP, 2005.
 Peter Nosco, Remembering Paradise. Nativism and Nostalgia in Eighteenth Century Japan. Cambridge, Massachusetts: Harvard UP, 1990.
 Michael Wachutka, Kokugaku in Meiji-period Japan: The Modern Transformation of 'National Learning' and the Formation of Scholarly Societies. Leiden, Boston: Global Oriental, 2013.

External links
 The Kokugaku (Native Studies) School.
 Kokugaku — Encyclopedia of Shinto.

History of science and technology in Japan
Japanese philosophy